League for Programming Freedom (LPF) was founded in 1989 by Richard Stallman to unite free software developers as well as developers of proprietary software to fight against software patents and the extension of the scope of copyright. Their logo is the Statue of Liberty holding a floppy disk and tape spool.

Among other initiatives, the League started the "Burn all GIFs" campaign in opposition to the actions of Unisys in enforcing their patent on LZW compression used by CompuServe when creating the image format.

The League produced a newsletter, Programming Freedom, in 11 issues from 1991 to 1995. These primary source materials chronicle the work of the organization.

The single event that had the most influence on the creation of the League was Apple's lawsuits against Microsoft about supposed copyrights violations of the look and feel of the Macintosh in the development of Windows. After the lawsuit ended, the League went dormant, to be resurrected by those who were increasingly troubled by the enforcement of software patents.

In September 2009, LPF President Dean Anderson sent a notice to former members announcing the return of the LPF and reviving its membership, with plans for an election on 12 May 2010.

Issue 1 to 6 can be read on neperos.com

See also 
 Electronic Frontier Foundation
 Free Software Foundation

References

External links 
 Official website
 LPF history page

Political organizations based in the United States
Intellectual property activism
Non-profit technology
Free Software Foundation
Information technology organizations based in North America